The Slovak koruna or Slovak crown (literally meaning Slovak crown) was the currency of Slovakia between 8 February 1993 and 31 December 2008, and could be used for cash payment until 16 January 2009. The ISO 4217 code was SKK and the local abbreviation was Sk.  The koruna was subdivided into 100 haliers (abbreviated as "hal." or simply "h", singular: halier). The abbreviation is placed after the numeric value.

Slovakia switched its currency from the koruna to the euro on 1 January 2009, at a rate of 30.1260 korunas per euro.

In Slovak, the nouns koruna and halier both have two plural forms. "Koruny" and haliere appear after the numbers 2, 3 and 4 and in generic (uncountable) context, with korún and halierov being used after other numbers. The latter forms are genitive.

Modern koruna
In 1993, the newly independent Slovakia introduced its own koruna, replacing the Czechoslovak koruna at par.

Coins
In 1993, coins were introduced in denominations of 10, 20 and 50 haliers, 1, 2, 5 and 10 korunas. The 10 and 20 halier coins were taken out of circulation on 31 December 2003. In 1996 the 50 halier coin was made smaller and instead of aluminium it was made with copper plated steel.

The obverse of the coins feature the coat of arms of Slovakia, with motifs from Slovak history on the reverses.
10 halierov (silver-coloured) – Octagonal wooden belfry from Zemplín (early 19th century) = €0.0033 
20 halierov (silver-coloured) – the Kriváň peak in the High Tatras = €0.0066 
50 halierov (copper-coloured) – Renaissance polygonal tower of Devín Castle = €0.0166 
1 koruna (copper-coloured) – Gothic wooden sculpture of the Madonna with child ( 1500) = €0.0332 
2 koruny (silver-coloured) – Earthen sculpture of the sitting Venus of Hradok (4th millennium BC) = €0.0664 
5 korún (silver-coloured) – Reverse of a Celtic coin of Biatec (1st century BC) = €0.166 
10 korún (copper-coloured) – Bronze cross (11th century A.D.) = €0.332

Coins were exchangeable for euros at the National Bank of Slovakia until January 2, 2014.

Banknotes
At midnight on 31 December 1992, the Czech and Slovak Federative Republic bifurcated into the Czech Republic and the Slovak Republic. In 1993, the newly independent Slovakia introduced its own koruna, replacing the Czechoslovak koruna at par. Provisional banknotes were issued in denominations of 20, 50, 100, 500, and 1,000 korún by affixing stamps bearing the coat of arms of Slovakia and the denomination to Czechoslovak banknotes.
Later that year Slovakia issued its own set of banknotes. The main motifs on the obverses of the banknotes represent important people living in the territory of the present Slovakia in various historical eras. On the reverses, these motifs are completed by depicting places where these people lived and were active.

Slovak banknotes denominated in koruny can be exchanged for euros indefinitely.

Historical exchange rates

The graph shows the value of the euro in korunas from 1999 to December 2008. As may be seen, the currency strengthened as Slovakia's economy did. The koruna joined the ERM II on 28 November 2005 at the rate of € = 38.4550 Sk with a 15% band. On 17 March 2007, this rate was readjusted to 35.4424 Sk with the same band, an 8.5% increase in the value of the koruna. On the same day, 1 euro traded at 33.959 Sk. The central rate of koruna was then adjusted once more on 28 May 2008 to 33.8545 with no change in the band.

See also
 Czechoslovak koruna
 Czech koruna
 Economy of Slovakia
 Slovak euro coins

Notes

References

External links
ECB: The euro cash changeover in Slovakia (as of 1 January 2009)
The banknotes of Slovakia 

Currencies of Europe
Currencies replaced by the euro
Currencies of Slovakia
Modern obsolete currencies
Banknotes of Europe
Currency symbols